Chi Herculis, Latinized from χ Herculis, is a Sun-like star in the northern constellation of Hercules. The star is faintly visible to the naked eye with an apparent visual magnitude of 4.59. It has a relatively high proper motion, showing a transverse movement of 0.769 arc seconds per year and is drifting closer to the Sun with a radial velocity of −56 km/s.

This is a suspected binary star system for which orbital elements have been published, listing a circular orbit with period of 51.3 days. However, sources do not confirm this and so the binarity remains in doubt. The surface magnetic activity for this star is distinctly lower than the typical level for regular stars, and hence it is considered a good candidate for being in a Maunder minimum phase.

Chi Herculis is an older star with an estimated age of 7.4 billion years and is spinning with a projected rotational velocity of 2.4. It has a mass slightly higher than the Sun and 1.7 times the Sun's radius. The star's photosphere is radiating 3.24 times the Sun's luminosity at an effective temperature of 5,837. Chi Herculis has been examined for the presence of an infrared excess that could indicate an orbiting debris disk, but none was found. The low metal content and a relatively high velocity of 80 kilometers per second suggest that the star is a visitor from another part of the Galaxy, and is just moving through the local neighborhood.

References

External links

G-type main-sequence stars
Maunder Minimum

Hercules (constellation)
Herculis, Chi
Herculis, 001
Durchmusterung objects
0602
142373
077760
5914